Edgar Zayas (born 24 February 1995 in Queretaro) is a Mexican professional squash player. As of February 2018, he was ranked number 212 in the world.

References

1995 births
Living people
Mexican male squash players